Tioga Falls is a 130-foot waterfall located near the outskirts of West Point, Kentucky. The falls are fed from the nearby Tioga Creek, a tributary to the Ohio River. The falls are accessed by way of a 1.8 mile trial managed by the U.S. Army Garrison at Fort Knox. As Tioga Falls are within the boundaries of the military base, the trail is periodically closed to the public for safety reasons.

References

Waterfalls
Local landmarks in Louisville, Kentucky